The 2020–21 Southeastern Conference men's basketball season began with practices in November 2020, followed by the start of the 2020–21 NCAA Division I men's basketball season on November 25. Conference play started in late December and will end in March, after which 14 member teams will participate in the 2021 SEC tournament at Bridgestone Arena in Nashville, Tennessee. The tournament champion is guaranteed a selection to the 2021 NCAA tournament.

The season was initially slated to begin on November 10, 2020, but was postponed due to the COVID-19 pandemic, which prematurely ended the previous season and continues to affect the current one.

Preseason 
Tennessee was predicted to win the 2021 SEC championship in voting by a select panel of both SEC and national media members. Florida's Keyontae Johnson was the choice of the media for SEC Men's Basketball Player of the Year.

Media Day selections

Preseason All-SEC teams

Head coaches

Note: Stats shown are before the beginning of the season. Overall and SEC records are from time at current school.

Conference matrix
This table summarizes the head-to-head results between teams in conference play.

References